Katharine Sinclair Duncan (née MacColl; 4 July 1888 – 15 August 1954) was a Scottish communist activist.

Duncan was born in Tarbert, Argyllshire to Archibald MacColl, a merchant, and Agnes Gibson MacColl (née Stephen).  She became a schoolteacher in Kirkcaldy and joined the National Union of Teachers (NUT).  In 1923, she married a fellow teacher, Alexander "Sandy" Duncan, and the couple soon moved to Hackney.  There, they became active in the Hackney Labour Dramatic Group and the Independent Labour Party.  However, their experience of the UK general strike of 1926 led them to instead join the Communist Party of Great Britain (CPGB).

Duncan soon came to prominence in the CPGB, renowned as a powerful speaker.  In 1929, she was elected to the party's central committee, although she stood down the following year, when she moved to Deptford.  There, she focused her time on the National Unemployed Workers Movement (NUWM), organising large demonstrations.  She stood unsuccessfully for Greenwich at the 1931 general election.

During 1932, local dockers marched in opposition to ships sending arms to Japan, which had just invaded Manchuria.  After one demonstration in Woolwich, both Kath and Sandy spoke; police charged the crowd and Sandy was hospitalised.  A larger protest meeting was held the following day on the Deptford Broadway, with Kath calling for the inspector in charge at the original demonstration to be sacked.  In December, Kath was charged with disturbing the peace over her speeches; she would not accept a condition of being bound over to the keep the peace, so was instead sentenced to six months in Holloway Prison.

Following Duncan's release, the London County Council removed her from their list of approved teachers, but the NUT organised a petition in her support, and the council reversed their decision.  Duncan, meanwhile, continued frequent public speeches, particularly in support of the NUWM.  In 1934, she stood for election to the London County Council in Deptford, but was not successful.

Duncan was again arrested in 1935, for speaking outside an unemployment exchange and refusing to move when asked by the police.  The National Council for Civil Liberties supported her in one of their first interventions in a court case; she was found guilty, but the case of Duncan vs Jones became a landmark, establishing that free speech was generally permitted, unless genuinely thought likely to cause a disturbance.

In the later 1930s, much of Duncan's time was devoted to opposing fascism, and she took part in the Battle of Cable Street.  She was also central to the Aid to Spain movement, and interviewed volunteers for the International Brigade in the Spanish Civil War.

Sandy died during World War II, and Kath increasingly struggled with arthritis.  Although still generally supportive of the CPGB, she began working for the local Labour Party Member of Parliament.  Yet, by the early 1950s, she was too ill to work, and she moved in with her sister in Kirkcaldy, dying in Stracathro Hospital in 1954.

During the 1930s she lived in Ommaney Road, New Cross London SE14.

References

1888 births
1954 deaths
Communist Party of Great Britain members
People from Argyll and Bute